Kevin Kowalyk (born 27 September 1980 in Winnipeg, Manitoba) is a Canadian rower. He competed with Michael Braithwaite in the double sculls at the 2012 Summer Olympics, where they were eliminated in the semifinals.

References

External links 
 

1980 births
Canadian male rowers
Living people
Olympic rowers of Canada
Rowers at the 2012 Summer Olympics
Rowers from Winnipeg